Mitchell Hay (born 20 August 2000) is a New Zealand cricketer. He made his List A debut on 13 December 2020, for Canterbury in the 2020–21 Ford Trophy. He made his Twenty20 debut on 10 December 2021, for Canterbury in the 2021–22 Super Smash. He made his first-class debut on 29 March 2022, for Canterbury in the 2021–22 Plunket Shield season.

References

External links
 

2000 births
Living people
New Zealand cricketers
Canterbury cricketers
Place of birth missing (living people)